The 2003 Kraft Nabisco Championship was a women's professional golf tournament, held March 27–30 at Mission Hills Country Club in Rancho Mirage, California. This was the 32nd edition of the Kraft Nabisco Championship, and the 21st edition as a major championship.

Patricia Meunier-Lebouc won her only major title, one stroke ahead of runner-up Annika Sörenstam, the two-time defending champion. Meunier-Lebouc was the leader by three strokes after 54 holes, but hit a tee shot out of bounds early in the final round, but regained the lead after a birdie at the 13th hole. Ahead by two strokes on the final hole, she played conservatively and three-putted for a bogey and the win.

The low amateur was 13-year-old Michelle Wie at even par, seven strokes back in a tie for ninth. After a 66 on Saturday to climb up to third place, she dropped back with a 76 on Sunday.

At this time, Sörenstam had won four of her ten major titles. In late May, she became the first woman to play in a PGA Tour event in 58 years. It was at the Colonial in Fort Worth, Texas, and she missed the cut by four strokes.

Past champions in the field

Made the cut

Source:

Missed the cut

Source:

Final leaderboard
Sunday, March 30, 2003

Source:

Amateurs: Michelle Wie (E), Virada Nirapathpongporn (+5), Lindsey Wright (+13).

References

External links
Golf Observer leaderboard

Chevron Championship
Golf in California
Kraft Nabisco Championship
Kraft Nabisco Championship
Kraft Nabisco Championship
Kraft Nabisco Championship
Women's sports in California